The following is a list of Chattanooga Mocs men's basketball head coaches. There have been 22 head coaches of the Mocs in their 105-season history.

Chattanooga's current head coach is Dan Earl. He was hired as the Mocs' head coach in March 2022, replacing Lamont Paris, who left to become the head coach at South Carolina.

References

Chattanooga

Chattanooga Mocs men's basketball coaches